Acacia galioides is a shrub belonging to the genus Acacia and the subgenus Lycopodiifoliae. It is native to an area in the Northern Territory and the Kimberley region of Western Australia,  and to northwestern Queensland and the eastern highlands of Queensland.

Ecology

See also
 List of Acacia species

References

galioides
Acacias of Western Australia
Flora of the Northern Territory
Flora of Queensland
Taxa named by George Bentham